The gray redhorse (Moxostoma congestum) is a species of freshwater fish in the family Catostomidae.  It is found in Mexico and the United States.

References

Moxostoma
Fish described in 1854
Taxonomy articles created by Polbot